Sijunzi Tang Wan also called the Four Gentlemen, is a brown pill used in Traditional Chinese medicine to "replenish qi and invigorate the functions of the spleen". It tastes slightly sweet. It is used where there is "deficiency of qi of the spleen and stomach marked by anorexia and loose bowels". SiJunzi Tang Wan is the base for many spleen qi deficiency formulas in Traditional Chinese medicine.

Chinese classic herbal formula

See also
 Chinese classic herbal formula
 Bu Zhong Yi Qi Wan

References

Traditional Chinese medicine pills